The United Nations Educational, Scientific and Cultural Organization (UNESCO) World Heritage Sites are places of importance to cultural or natural heritage as described in the UNESCO World Heritage Convention, established in 1972. Below is the list and the tentative list of sites in Turkmenistan. (For the criteria see the Selection criteria)

Gallery

References and notes 

Turkmenistan
World Heritage Sites
 
World Heritage Sites